Edward of Westminster (13 October 1453 – 4 May 1471), also known as Edward of Lancaster, was the only son of Henry VI of England and Margaret of Anjou. He was killed aged seventeen at the Battle of Tewkesbury.

Early life
Edward was born at the Palace of Westminster, London, the only son of Henry VI of England and his wife, Margaret of Anjou. At the time, there was strife between Henry's supporters and those of Richard of York, 3rd Duke of York, who had a claim to the throne and challenged the authority of Henry's officers of state. Henry was suffering from mental illness, and there were widespread rumours that the prince was the result of an affair between his mother and one of her loyal supporters. Edmund Beaufort, 2nd Duke of Somerset and James Butler, 5th Earl of Ormond, were both suspected of fathering Prince Edward; however, there is no firm evidence to support the rumours, and Henry himself never doubted the boy's legitimacy and publicly acknowledged paternity. Edward was invested as Prince of Wales at Windsor Castle in 1454.

War over the English throne
In 1460, Henry was captured by the supporters of the Duke of York at the Battle of Northampton and taken to London. The Duke of York was dissuaded from claiming the throne immediately, but he induced Parliament to pass the Act of Accord, by which Henry was allowed to reign but Edward was disinherited, as York or his heirs would become king on Henry's death.

Queen Margaret and Edward had meanwhile fled through Cheshire. By Margaret's later account, she induced outlaws and pillagers to aid her by pledging them to recognise the seven-year-old Edward as rightful heir to the crown. They subsequently reached safety in Wales and journeyed to Scotland, where Margaret raised support, while the Duke of York's enemies gathered in the north of England.

After York was killed at the Battle of Wakefield, the large army which Margaret had gathered advanced south. They defeated the army of Richard Neville, 16th Earl of Warwick, one of York's most prominent supporters, at the Second Battle of St Albans. Warwick had brought the captive Henry in the train of his army, and he was found abandoned on the battlefield. Two of Warwick's knights, William Bonville, 1st Baron Bonville, and Sir Thomas Kyriell, who had agreed to remain with Henry and see that he came to no harm, were captured. The day after the battle, Margaret asked Edward what death the two knights should suffer. Edward readily replied that their heads should be cut off.

Exile in France

Margaret hesitated to advance on London with her unruly army, and subsequently retreated. They were routed at the Battle of Towton a few weeks later. Margaret and Edward fled once again, to Scotland. For the next three years, Margaret inspired several revolts in the northernmost counties of England, but was eventually forced to sail to France, where she and Edward maintained a court in exile. (Henry had once again been captured and was a prisoner in the Tower of London.)

In 1467 the ambassador of the Duchy of Milan to the court of France wrote that Edward "already talks of nothing but cutting off heads or making war, as if he had everything in his hands or was the god of battle or the peaceful occupant of that throne."

After several years in exile, Margaret took the best opportunity that presented itself and allied herself with the renegade Earl of Warwick. Louis XI of France wanted to start a war with Burgundy, allies of the Yorkist Edward IV. He believed if he allied himself to restoring Lancastrian rule they would help him conquer Burgundy. As a compliment to his new allies Louis made young Edward godfather to his son Charles. Prince Edward was married to Anne Neville, Warwick's younger daughter, in December 1470, though there is some doubt as to whether the marriage was ever consummated.

Battles of Barnet and Tewkesbury

Warwick returned to England and deposed Edward IV, with the help of Edward IV's younger brother, the Duke of Clarence. Edward IV fled into exile to Burgundy with his youngest brother the Duke of Gloucester, while Warwick restored Henry VI to the throne.  Prince Edward and Margaret lingered behind in France until April 1471. However, Edward IV had already raised an army, returned to England, and reconciled with Clarence. On the same day Margaret and Edward landed in England (14 April), Edward IV defeated and killed Warwick at the Battle of Barnet. With little real hope of success, the inexperienced prince and his mother led the remnant of their forces to meet Edward IV in the Battle of Tewkesbury. They were defeated and Edward of Westminster was killed.

According to contemporary sources, Edward was overtaken and slain in the battle during the rout of the Lancastrians, with some accounts attributing the deed to the Duke of Clarence, to whom the prince appealed to for help. Paul Murray Kendall, a biographer of Richard III, accepts this version of events. Another version states that Clarence and his men found the grieving prince near a grove following the battle, and immediately beheaded him on a makeshift block, despite his pleas.

Another account of Edward's death is given by three Tudor sources: The Grand Chronicle of London, Polydore Vergil, and Edward Hall. It was later dramatised by William Shakespeare in Henry VI, Part 3, Act V, scene v. Their story is that Edward was captured and brought before the victorious Edward IV and his brothers and followers. The king received the prince graciously, and asked him why he had taken up arms against him. The prince replied defiantly, "I came to recover my father's heritage." The king then struck the prince across his face with his gauntlet hand, and his brothers killed the prince with their swords.

However, none of these accounts appear in any of the contemporaneous sources, which all report that Edward died in battle.

Edward's body is buried at Tewkesbury Abbey. His widow, Anne Neville, married the Duke of Gloucester, who eventually succeeded as Richard III in 1483.

Epitaph
The Latin memorial brass to Edward in Tewkesbury Abbey is set in the floor between the choir stalls, under the tower. It reads as follows:

This can be translated into English as follows:

"Here lies Edward, Prince of Wales,
cruelly slain whilst but a youth.
Anno Domini 1471, May fourth.
Alas, the savagery of men.
Thou art the sole light of thy Mother,
and the last hope of thy race."

Ancestry and family tree

Notes

References
 R. A. Griffiths, The Reign of King Henry VI (1981), especially the Epilogue. 
 Alison Weir, Lancaster and York: The Wars of the Roses, London (1995)

External links
 Richard III Society
 The Death of Edward of Lancaster at Tewkesbury

|-

|-

1453 births
1471 deaths
15th-century English nobility
Princes of Wales
Dukes of Cornwall
English military personnel killed in action
Heirs apparent who never acceded
Heirs to the English throne
Edward of Westminster
People from Westminster
People of the Wars of the Roses
English Roman Catholics
Burials at Tewkesbury Abbey
Sons of kings